The Francis Marion Patriots are the athletic teams that represent Francis Marion University, located in Florence, South Carolina, in intercollegiate sports at the Division II level of the National Collegiate Athletic Association (NCAA), primarily competing in Conference Carolinas since the 2021–22 academic year.

Francis Marion competes in fifteen intercollegiate varsity sports. Men's sports include baseball, basketball, cross country, golf, soccer, tennis, and track and field; while women's sports include acrobatics and tumbling, basketball, cross country, soccer, softball, tennis, track and field, and volleyball. Francis Marion's men's golf program competes at the Division I level as an affiliate member of the Southland Conference.

Conference affiliations 
NCAA
 Peach Belt Conference (1990–2021)
 Conference Carolinas (2021–present)

Varsity teams

National championships

Team

Individual

References

External links